The Academia Paraguaya de la Lengua Española (Spanish for Paraguayan Academy of Language) is an association of academics and experts on the use of the Spanish language in Paraguay.
It was founded on June 30, 1927. It is a member of the Association of Spanish Language Academies.

External links
 Official Site (Spanish)

Spanish language academies
Paraguayan culture
Organizations established in 1927
1927 establishments in South America